Narvik is a railway station located in Narvik Municipality in Nordland, Norway on the Ofoten Line. It is served by three daily passenger trains from, respectively, Kiruna, Luleå and Stockholm in Sweden. These passenger services are currently operated by Vy Tåg. It was opened in 1902 along with Ofotbanen and the Iron Ore Line.

The station at Narvik is the northernmost station in the Schengen Area and the northernmost standard-gauge railway station in the world. It represents the northern terminus for one of Europe's most celebrated night trains. The  leaves Stockholm around six every afternoon, reaches Lappmarken by early the following morning, and then traverses the mountains that delimit the modern frontier between Sweden and Norway to reach the Ofotfjord, on the south shore of which lies the port of Narvik, where it arrives early afternoon. It is a journey which has been praised as "surely one of the most engaging adventures by train in all Europe".

Onward journey is by bus only. The Narvik bus station is located about  further south. Northbound buses stop also at the E6 highway a few hundred metres from the railway station, but not at the railway station. Southbound buses go from the bus station.

References

Railway stations in Narvik
Railway stations on the Ofoten Line
Railway stations opened in 1902
1902 establishments in Norway